Air China Cargo Co., Ltd. is a cargo airline of the People's Republic of China with its headquarters in Shunyi District in Beijing. It is an all-cargo subsidiary of Air China and operates scheduled freighter services to 20 cities in 10 countries around the world. Its main base is Beijing Capital International Airport.

History
The airline was established in 2003 and started operations shortly thereafter. It is owned by Air China (51%), CITIC Pacific (25%) and Beijing Capital International (24%) and has around 4,000 employees (as of March 2013).

In May 2011, Air China and Cathay Pacific announced the consolidation of their cargo business to the new Air China Cargo.

Destinations
Air China Cargo serves the following airports as of January 2018:

Asia
 
 Beijing - Beijing Capital International Airport Hub
 Chengdu - Chengdu Shuangliu International Airport
 Chongqing - Chongqing Jiangbei International Airport
 Shanghai
 Shanghai Hongqiao International Airport
 Shanghai Pudong International Airport Hub
 Tianjin - Tianjin Binhai International Airport
 Zhengzhou - Zhengzhou Xinzheng International Airport
 
 Hong Kong - Hong Kong International Airport
 
 Osaka - Kansai International Airport
 Tokyo
 Haneda Airport
 Narita International Airport
 
 Taipei - Taoyuan International Airport
 Taipei - Songshan Airport

Europe

 Liège - Liège Airport
 
 Copenhagen - Copenhagen Airport
 
 Paris - Charles de Gaulle Airport
 
 Frankfurt - Frankfurt Airport
 Munich - Munich Airport
 
 Amsterdam - Amsterdam Airport Schiphol
 
 Novosibirsk - Tolmachevo Airport
 
 Zaragoza - Zaragoza Airport

America
 
 Anchorage - Ted Stevens Anchorage International Airport
 Chicago - Chicago O'Hare International Airport
 Dallas - Dallas/Fort Worth International Airport
 Los Angeles - Los Angeles International Airport
 New York City - John F. Kennedy International Airport

Fleet

Current fleet
, Air China Cargo fleet consists of the following freighter aircraft:

Retired Fleet

The Air China Cargo retired fleet consists of the following freighter aircraft:

See also

Air China
Cathay Pacific
China Postal Airlines

References

External links

Air China Cargo
Air China Cargo 

Airlines of China
Airlines established in 2003
Cargo airlines of China
Companies based in Beijing
Government-owned companies of China
Air China
Chinese companies established in 2003